Peter of Courtenay may refer to:
Peter I of Courtenay (died 1183), son of Louis VI of France
Peter II of Courtenay (died 1219), emperor of Constantinople
Peter of Courtenay, Lord of Conches (died 1249/50), crusader

See also
House of Courtenay
Peter Courtenay (disambiguation)